The Copa de la Reina de Baloncesto 2019 was the 57th edition of the Spanish Queen's Basketball Cup. It is managed by the Spanish Basketball Federation – FEB and was 28 February to 3 March 2019 in the Polideportivo de Mendizorroza, Vitoria-Gasteiz. Perfumerías Avenida beat Spar CityLift Girona 79-71 in the final. Érika de Souza was the MVP.

Qualification
Prior to the start of the season, the rules of the Spanish Basketball Federation established that the top seven teams classified after the end of the first half of the 2018–19 League (13th matchday, 30 December 2018),  would play the competition along with the host chosen by the Federation.

Qualified teams

Draw
The Cup was drawn on 15 February 2019 in Vitoria-Gasteiz. The seeded teams were paired in the quarterfinals with the non-seeded teams. There were not any restrictions for the draw of the semifinals.

Bracket

References

External links
Liga Femenina official website

2019
2018–19 in Spanish women's basketball
2018–19 in Spanish basketball cups